The Fool is a 2014 Russian crime drama film written and directed by Yuri Bykov. It had its international premiere at the 2014 Locarno International Film Festival, where it won the prize for the best actor (Bystrov).

This is the third film of writer and director Yury Bykov. The Fool is a 2014 Russian realistic melodrama, and displays the tragic attempt of how integrity and courage cannot fix the corruption of the governments and the indolence of society to combat it. The film received generally positive reviews.

Plot
Dima Nikitin, a Russian plumber, is a municipal repair-crew chief and is studying building engineering in an unnamed Russian town. He is a dauntless young man surrounded by the adverse effects of his pessimistic family and harshly uncaring community. He lives with his hasty mother, apathetic father, and wife and son. He faces financial struggles while studying and attempting to complete engineering school while working as a plumber. When Dima discovers a leaky pipe in a building, he stresses the importance of urgent action. When Dima goes outside to inspect the manner, he notices the entire building is tilting. 

His compassionate and good-hearted character cannot rest with the knowledge that the inevitable destruction of the building will occur within the next 24 hours. Dima goes out of his way to alert the necessary authorities about the matter at hand. When he tries to warn the Mayor Nina Galaganova, he passes the inspector of public housing, Fedotov. While attempting to inform the officials, it is apparent that they are too intoxicated to understand the severity. They joke around with the validity of Dima's claim, saying he’s probably sleeping with some girl whom he offered a new apartment. They only become concerned once they realize what others will think of them and how they will lose everything after the destruction. They are hit with the guilt of taking out money for themselves and letting the accidents pile on top of each other until they are faced with the catastrophe of abruptly trying to relocate 800 residents who are slowly killing themselves.

Galaganova sends Fedotov and Matugin to assess the damage with Nikitin. The officials soon accept that the building will indeed fall, and return to report this to the Mayor. They all realize that an evacuation of this scale would cause a financial review and reveal years of embezzlement. 

Galaganova and Bogachyov decide to pin the expected building collapse on Fedotov and Matugin. Together with Nikitin, Fedotov and Matugin are instructed by Sayapin, the police chief, that arrangements are being made for evacuation. The trio are put into a police van and taken allegedly to meet Galaganova, but instead, they are driven to a remote location on the city outskirts. It becomes clear to them that Galaganova is covering her tracks by eliminating them, to pin the eventual collapse of the building on them. Fedotov pleads with the policemen to release Nikitin and they reluctantly agree, instructing him to leave the city with his family immediately. Matugin and Fedotov are executed.

Despite Dima's efforts, no one is evacuating the building. Dima takes matters into his own hands, going banging from door to door urging residents to leave before the building collapses. “We live like animals and we die like animals because we are nobodies to each other”, Dima stresses to his wife Masha when she refuses to care about the wellbeing of others. Despite his bravery, he gets attacked for disrupting the entire building, as no one believes him or supports his efforts. 

The final scene is Dima laying in a fetal position after getting punched by arrogant and annoyed residents. The fate of the residents is left in the arms of the viewer's imagination.

Cast
 Artyom Bystrov as Dima Nikitin, an idealistic plumber 
 Natalya Surkova as Nina Galaganova, town mayor
 Boris Nevzorov as Fedotov, deceitful boss of Dima 
 Yuriy Tsurilo as Bogachyov
 Kirill Polukhin as Matyugin 
 Maksim Pinsker as Sayapin

Cinematography
The film’s grave use of dark settings, unhappy characters, and dreary lighting helps carry the narrative of painful reality. The story could’ve easily fit into an account of how an idealistic man saves a collapsing building but instead the film focuses on shining light on tragedy of penurious living situations.

Reception
The Fool has received generally positive reviews from critics. On Rotten Tomatoes, the film holds a rating of 93%, based on 14 reviews, with an average rating of 7.7/10. On Metacritic the film has a score of 83 out of 100, based on 7 critics, indicating "universal acclaim".

Peter Debruge of Variety magazine wrote: "Frank Capra would have approved of The Fool, a forceful Russian drama in which a lone plumber stands up to a corrupt system on behalf of the people living in a squalid apartment building."

In 2018 users of the Russian movie database KinoPoisk voted it to be the best Russian movie made in the past 15 years.

Awards and nominations
 Gorin Prize for the Best Script, Open Russian Film Festival Kinotavr in Sochi, 2014
 Best Actor Leopard, awarded to Artyom Bystrov, Locarno International Film Festival, 2014
 Ecumenical Prize, Locarno International Film Festival, 2014
 Junior Jury Award, First Prize, Locarno International Film Festival, 2014
 Atlas d’Argent de la mise en scène (silver prize), Arras Film Festival, 2014
 Audience Choice Award, Arras Film Festival, 2014
 Young Jury Prize, Arras Film Festival, 2014
 Flèche de Cristal, Festival de cinéma européen des Arcs, 2014
 Best Cinematography Prize, awarded to Kirill Klepalov, Festival de cinéma européen des Arcs, 2014
 Youth Jury Award, Festival de cinéma européen des Arcs, 2014
 Best Screenplay, Dublin Film Critics Circle Awards, Jameson Dublin International Film Festival, 2015

Themes and Meanings
The movie encompasses many negative aspects of life in Russia. There are several heartbreaking scenes, from families violently fighting over money to a drunk wife on the floor being left by her husband to see another woman. There are rarely any softhearted interactions between characters. Dimas hope and determination against the pretentious and complacent bureaucrats do not stand against their cunning egos. Dima is regarded as “the fool” with his hopes of fighting against the corruption of Russian society. His good heart cannot fight against the greed of others and the indifference of bettering the community. Dima, in taking his own path and straying from the typical passivity of his fellow citizens, shows the lonesome side of heroism. In addition, the film does not reward him for his high character and instead emphasizes the true impact of an amoral society. The subtle effort to portray altruism into foolishness in the film goes alongside its endeavor to highlight Russia’s poor living situation, instilling a range of emotions, from hope to empathy, within the viewer.

References

External links
  (Olive Films)
 

2014 films
2014 crime drama films
Russian crime drama films
Russian thriller drama films
2010s Russian-language films
Films directed by Yuri Bykov
Films about corruption
Films set in apartment buildings
Films set in Russia
Films shot in Russia